Till is an album by Roger Williams. It was released in 1958 on the Kapp label (catalog no. KL-1081).

The album debuted on Billboard magazine's popular albums chart on March 31, 1958, reached the No. 4 spot, and remained on that chart for 61 weeks. It was certified as a gold record by the RIAA.

AllMusic gave the album a rating of four-and-a-half stars. Reviewer Lindsay Planer wrote that it "aged remarkably well" with "melodies . . . slightly revised and incorporated into decidedly austere modernizations that work surprisingly well."

Track listing

Side A
 "Till
 "April Love"
 "Arrivederci, Roma"
 "Que Sera, Sera"
 "Jalousie"
 "The High and the Mighty"

Side B
 "Fascination"
 "Tammy"
 "The Sentimental Touch"
 "Oh, My Papa"
 "Brahm's A Flat Waltz"
 "Moonlight Love"

References

1958 albums
Kapp Records albums
Roger Williams (pianist) albums